The 2018 European Cadet Judo Championships is an edition of the European Cadet Judo Championships, organised by the International Judo Federation. It was held at the Zetra Olympic Hall in Sarajevo, Bosnia and Herzegovina from 28 June to 1 July 2018. The final day of competition featured a mixed team event, won by team Russia.

Medal summary

Medal table

Men's events

Women's events

Source Results

Mixed

Source Results

References

External links
 

 U18
European Cadet Judo Championships
European Championships, U18
Judo
Judo
Judo, European Championships U18